Nora Hamou Maamar (born 18 May 1983) is a former footballer who played as midfielder. Born in France, she has been a member of the Algeria women's national team.

Club career
Hamou Maamar played for Montpellier HSC from 2002 to 2013 before leaving for Nîmes.

With Montpellier, she has won two Leagues and three national Cups.

International career
Hamou Maamar was a member of the Algeria women's national football team at the 2010 African Women's Championship in South Africa.

References

1983 births
Living people
Algerian women's footballers
Women's association football midfielders
Algeria women's international footballers
Sportspeople from Blois
French women's footballers
Montpellier HSC (women) players
Division 1 Féminine players
French sportspeople of Algerian descent
Footballers from Centre-Val de Loire